Full30 is an American online video-sharing platform mainly dedicated to firearms and shooting sports-related content. The service was established in 2014 by Tim Harmsen and Mark Hammonds as a result of YouTube's increasing restrictions on gun-related videos.

History
After the Stoneman Douglas High School shooting, many companies attempted to distance themselves from any association with the firearms industry. As a result, YouTube began demonetizing and sometimes outright deleting firearms-related videos, and in one case, popular YouTube poster Hickok45's channel was completely deleted but later restored. In response, Harmsen, who operates the Military Arms Channel on YouTube, decided to create his own video-hosting website to allow himself and other firearms content creators a platform free from such restrictions; he named the website Full30 — a reference to the popular 30-round STANAG magazine.

Contributors to Full30, in addition to Hickok45 and Military Arms Channel, include Forgotten Weapons, Bavarian Shooter, Liberty Doll, and CloverTac.

In July 2020, site representatives announced the site had new ownership.

References

Internet properties established in 2014
Video hosting
Social media
Firearms-related organizations